The 1940 Syracuse Orangemen football team represented Syracuse University in the 1940 college football season. The Orangemen were led by fourth-year head coach Ossie Solem and played their home games at Archbold Stadium in Syracuse, New York.

Schedule

References

Syracuse
Syracuse Orange football seasons
Syracuse Orangemen football